The 2016–17 Momentum One Day Cup was a domestic one-day cricket championship in South Africa. It was the 36th time the championship was contested. The competition started on 17 February 2017 and concluded with the final on 31 March 2017. Six teams competed, with the Lions being the defending champions.

Titans topped the group table, securing a home match in the final. Knights and Warriors finished second and third respectively, advancing to the play-off qualifier, with the winner meeting Titans in the final. The qualifier was abandoned after 28 overs of play, due to concerns with the playing surface. The match was replayed on the same pitch the following day, once the groundstaff had prepared the surface. Warriors won the qualifier by 18 runs to advance to the final. Titans won the tournament, defeating Warriors by 236 runs in the final. Titans' total of 425 for 5 in the final was the highest team total in the history of the competition.

Points table

 Teams qualified for the finals

Fixtures

Round-robin

Finals

References

External links
 Series home at ESPN Cricinfo

South African domestic cricket competitions
Momentum One Day Cup
2016–17 South African cricket season